Viviana Venezia Villacorta (born February 2, 1999) is an American professional soccer player who plays as a midfielder for Orlando Pride of the National Women's Soccer League (NWSL).

Early life 
Born in Torrance, California, Villacorta played four years of soccer at Mira Costa High School and earned Bay League first-team honors three times. She won the USYS National Championships in 2015 and 2016 with Cal South ODP teams. Villacorta played four years of club soccer with United Women's Soccer team Santa Clarita Blue Heat, winning the National Championship title in the inaugural 2016 season as well as back to back West conference titles.

UCLA Bruins 
Villacorta played four seasons of college soccer at University of California, Los Angeles between 2017 and 2021 while also earning a degree in sociology. As a freshman she played in all 25 games including 15 starts. The team finished second in the Pac-12 conference behind Stanford and qualified for the postseason, reaching the final of the 2017 College Cup before again losing out to their conference rivals. In 2018, Villacorta played in all 22 games, starting all but the season opener, and earned second-team All-Pac-12 honors. She scored four goals in total with her first collegiate career goal coming away at Stanford in a 3–2 defeat. UCLA again finished second in conference play and reached the quarterfinals of the NCAA Tournament before being eliminated by North Carolina in a penalty shootout. In 2019, Villacorta was an ever-present, starting in all 24 games. She scored three goals as well as a career-high eight assists, earning second-team All-Pac-12 honors for a second consecutive season as UCLA again finished second behind Stanford and reached the semifinals of the postseason, losing 4–1 to Stanford. Villacorta elected to delay her pro career and return in 2021 to contest her senior season despite being drafted in January following the NCAA's offer of a waiver in light of the COVID-19 pandemic that meant draftees were able to remain in college to contest the rescheduled college spring season. Having never missed a game for UCLA since joining as a freshman in 2017, Villacorta suffered an ACL tear 18 minutes into the opening game against Pepperdine on February 7, ending her collegiate career prematurely.

Club career

Orlando Pride 
On January 13, 2021, Villacorta was selected in the first round (9th overall) of the 2021 NWSL Draft by Orlando Pride and had originally planned to join the team following the delayed college spring season. After suffering an ACL tear during a college game in February, Villacorta signed a one-year plus option year contract with Orlando on August 6, 2021, and immediately placed on the season-ending injury list. She did not feature during the 2022 NWSL Challenge Cup but was named as a substitute in a matchday squad for the first time in the final game on April 23, 2022. She made her professional debut in the next game, as a 72nd-minute substitute in the team's regular season opener, a 3–0 defeat to NJ/NY Gotham FC.

International career 
As well as the United States, Villacorta is eligible to represent Peru and El Salvador internationally through her parents.

She has represented the United States at under-18, under-19 and under-20 level. In January 2018, Villacorta was named to the squad for the 2018 CONCACAF Women's U-20 Championship, making four appearances as the United States finished as runners-up to Mexico. In August she was part of the squad at the 2018 FIFA U-20 Women's World Cup held in France, starting all three group stage games as the team failed to progress after finishing third behind Spain and Japan. In 2019, Villacorta was selected to represent the United States at the 2019 Summer Universiade.

Personal life
Villacorta's father, Julio, won a state championship with El Camino College's soccer team. She has two older sisters, Vanessa and Veronica, who both played college soccer at UC Merced.

Career statistics

College summary

Club summary 
.

Honors

College
NCAA College Cup runner-up: 2017

Club
Santa Clarita Blue Heat
UWS National Championship: 2016

References

External links 
 UCLA profile
 

1999 births
Living people
People from Torrance, California
Sportspeople from Torrance, California
Soccer players from California
American women's soccer players
Women's association football midfielders
UCLA Bruins women's soccer players
Orlando Pride draft picks
Orlando Pride players
National Women's Soccer League players
American sportspeople of Peruvian descent
American sportspeople of Salvadoran descent